Jagajeet Shrestha is a Nepali footballer who last played for Preston Lions in State League 1 as a midfielder. He was called to Nepali internationals at the 2014 FIFA World Cup qualifiers and most recently for the 2019 Asian Cup Qualifiers in late 2017.

Club career 
Jagajeet Shrestha was born in Bhaktapur, a sub district of Kathmandu in 1993. He soon developed a reputation for his skills and fiery style of play despite his short height. He started his career at Yeti Himalayan Sherpa Club scoring 25 goals.

In 2011, VfB Stuttgart agreed to a 1-year deal to train Shrestha.

In 2012, Shrestha moved on to Friends Club, and in 2013 transferred to the Three Star Club.

In June 2014 Shrestha secured a 2-month trial with the Polish football club, Jagiellonia Białystok.

He played for Three Star Club before signing an 18-month contract with Hume United FC. He scored two goals for Hume United FC in his debut match against Sporting. After showing potential many clubs keep eyes on him but Sunshine George Cross signed him a year deal. He was instrumental in his team's displays early in the season.

After moves to Nunawading City & Preston Lions, Jagajeet is currently a free agent.

International career 
Shrestha represented Nepal at the U13, U14, U16, and U19 levels. He has also represented his country at the 2011 SAFF Championship, 2012 Nehru Cup, 2014 FIFA World Cup qualifiers, and the 2013 SAFF Championship. He scored his only goal so far in a 5-0 world qualifier match victory against Timor-Leste.

International goals 

Scores and results list Nepal's goal tally first.

References

External links 
 

1993 births
Living people
Sportspeople from Kathmandu
Association football midfielders
Nepalese footballers
Nepal international footballers
Footballers at the 2014 Asian Games
Three Star Club players
Nepalese expatriate footballers
Nepalese expatriate sportspeople in Australia
Expatriate soccer players in Australia
Asian Games competitors for Nepal